Dicrotophos is an organophosphate acetylcholinesterase inhibitor used as an insecticide. Some common brand names for dicrotophos include Bidrin, Carbicron, Diapadrin, Dicron and Ektafos.

References

Acetylcholinesterase inhibitors
Organophosphate insecticides
Carboxamides